Rajooru also spelled Rajur is a village in the Kukanoor taluk of Koppal district in the Indian state of Karnataka.

See also
Benakal
Munirabad
Hampi
Koppal
Karnataka

References

Villages in Koppal district